Dale Womersley (10 September 1891 – 10 February 1971) was an English cricketer. He played one match for Essex in 1910.

References

External links

1891 births
1971 deaths
English cricketers
Essex cricketers
People from Ingatestone